Govindram Miri (born 1 September 1944 in Hardi, Bilaspur District) was a member of the 6th Lok Sabha of India. He represented the Sarangarh constituency of Chhattisgarh then Madhya Pradesh as member of Janata Party. He was a member of the Bharatiya Janata Party political party.

He serves as twice as Lok Sabha member from Sarangarh constituency and once as Rajya Sabha member from Madhya Pradesh.

References

India MPs 1977–1979
1944 births
Chhattisgarh politicians
Janata Party politicians
Bharatiya Janata Party politicians from Chhattisgarh
Lok Sabha members from Madhya Pradesh
People from Bilaspur, Chhattisgarh
Rajya Sabha members from Madhya Pradesh
Living people